Pontania californica, generally known as the willow apple gall sawfly, is a species of common sawfly in the family Tenthredinidae.

References

External links

 

Sawflies